An Thủy may refer to several places in Vietnam, including:

 , a rural commune of Ba Tri District.
 An Thủy, Quảng Bình, a rural commune of Lệ Thủy District.